The 1968 Major League Baseball All-Star Game was the 39th playing of the midsummer classic between the all-stars of the American League (AL) and National League (NL), the two leagues comprising Major League Baseball.

The game was held on July 9, 1968, at the Astrodome in Houston, Texas the home of the Houston Astros of the National League, making this the first All-Star Game to be played indoors. The game resulted in the National League defeating the American League 1–0.  It is the only All-Star Game played without a run batted in (RBI).

This was the first night All-Star Game since 1944. Apart from the 1969 game (which was originally scheduled to be played at night but was postponed to the following afternoon due to rain), all subsequent All-Star Games have been played at night.

Game summary
The American League was limited to three hits, unable to get a rally going against Don Drysdale, Juan Marichal, Steve Carlton and Tom Seaver, all future Hall of Famers.

A first-inning run scored by Willie Mays on a single, an errant pickoff attempt, a wild pitch by Luis Tiant and a double-play ball gave the winning National league the only run they would need.

Don Wert's eighth-inning double momentarily gave the AL a threat to tie the game, but Seaver struck out the side. In the ninth, with two out, Jerry Koosman was brought in from the bullpen to face Carl Yastrzemski, whose strikeout ended the game.

Starting lineups

Reserves

American League

Pitchers

Position players

National League

Pitchers

Position players

Line score

Line score

External links
Baseball Almanac
Boxscore at Baseball-Reference

Major League Baseball All-Star Game
Major League Baseball All-Star Game
Major League Baseball All-Star Game
Baseball competitions in Houston
July 1968 sports events in the United States
1960s in Houston